Statistics of Austrian Football Bundesliga in the 1989–90 season.

Overview
Fall season was contested by 12 teams, and higher eight teams go into Meister playoff. Lower four teams fought in Mittlere Playoff with higher four teams of Austrian Football First League.

FC Swarovski Tirol won the championship.

Teams and location

Teams of 1989–90 Austrian Football Bundesliga
FC Admira/Wacker
Austria Salzburg
Austria Wien
First Vienna
Grazer AK
Kremser
Rapid Wien
Sankt Pölten
Swarovski Tirol
Sturm Graz
Vorwärts Steyr
Wiener Sport-Club

Autumn season

Table

Results

Spring season

Championship playoff

Table

Results

Promotion/relegation playoff

Table

Results

References
Austria - List of final tables (RSSSF)

Austrian Football Bundesliga seasons
Austria
1989–90 in Austrian football